Pain Mahalleh-ye Lafmejan (also Romanized as Pā’īn Maḩalleh-ye Lafmejān) is a village in Lafmejan Rural District, in the Central District of Lahijan County, Gilan Province, Iran. At the 2006 census, its population was 159, in 54 families.

References 

Populated places in Lahijan County